Events during the year 1977 in Northern Ireland.

Incumbents
Secretary of State - Roy Mason

Events
The overt British Army lead in security policy is scaled back in favour of police primacy during the year.
29 May - A massive peace rally takes place in Belfast organized by Betty Williams, Mairéad Corrigan and Ciarán McKeown.
May - Shankill Butchers are arrested.
10 August - Elizabeth II visits Northern Ireland as part of her Silver Jubilee celebrations under tight security.
September - Rev. Ian Paisley launches the Save Ulster from Sodomy campaign to oppose the decriminalisation of homosexuality.
10 October - The Peace Movement founders, Mairéad Corrigan and Betty Williams win the Nobel Prize for Peace.

Arts and literature

Sport

Football
Irish League
Winners: Glentoran

Irish Cup
Winners: Coleraine 4 - 1 Linfield

Golf
Moyola Park Golf Club is founded.

Births
4 January - Tim Wheeler, singer-songwriter and guitarist.
7 January - Tomm Moore, twice Oscar nominated animator and film maker.
10 January - Michelle O'Neill, Sinn Féin leader.
10 March - Colin Murray, radio DJ.
16 July - Bryan Budd, Parachute Regiment Corporal, posthumously awarded the Victoria Cross (killed on active service 2006 in Afghanistan).
10 August - Danny Griffin, footballer.
23 August - Davy Larmour, footballer.
11 September - Enda Muldoon, Gaelic footballer.
15 October - Paul McKee, sprint athlete.
6 December - Paul McVeigh, footballer.
16 December - Darren Fitzgerald, footballer.

Deaths

3 March - Brian Faulkner, Baron Faulkner of Downpatrick, sixth and last Prime Minister of Northern Ireland, Ulster Unionist Party MP (born 1921).
17 April - William Conway, Cardinal Archbishop of Armagh (born 1913).
24 April - Geoffrey Bing, lawyer and Labour politician in UK (born 1909).
2 June - Stephen Boyd, actor (born 1931).
1 August - Bill Loughery, cricketer (born 1907).

See also 
 1977 in Scotland
 1977 in Wales

References 

 
Northern Ireland